Eleanor Rose Ty, FRSC, is a Professor in the Department of English and Film Studies at Wilfrid Laurier University. She holds a PhD and MA in English from McMaster University, and a BA Hons from the University of Toronto.

Career 
Eleanor Ty works on Asian American and Asian Canadian literature and film, life writing, graphic novel, Canadian literature and Eighteenth Century British novels. She is the recipient of a Fulbright Canada Research Chair, 2018–2019, at the University of California, Santa Barbara. She was awarded University Research Professor at Wilfrid Laurier University in 2015.

She has published eleven books:  two edited collections on memory studies, five books on Asian American and Asian Canadian Studies, and four on Eighteenth-Century British literature. Asianfail: Narratives of Disenchantment and the Model Minority won the APALA: Asian/Pacific American Librarians Association award for Adult Non-Fiction book in Literature for 2017. Her co-edited book, Asian Canadian Writing Beyond Autoethnography, received an honorable mention in the literature category in 2008 from The Association for Asian American Studies. Her research on 18th Century revolutionary novelists, on Filipino American literature, and on women writers has often been cited by other scholars and resources.

In 2017, Eleanor Ty served as the program co-chair with Angie Chung for the annual conference of the Association for Asian American Studies held in Portland, Oregon. With James Skidmore, Eleanor Ty served as Academic Co-Convenor of Congress for the Canadian Federation for the Humanities and Social Sciences in 2012 held in Waterloo.

Awards 
 2019 Fellow of the Royal Society of Canada 
 2018-2019 Fulbright Canada Visiting Research Chair, University of California Santa Barbara
 2017-2018 Asianfail was the Winner of the 2017/18 Asian/Pacific American Award for Literature in Adult Non-Fiction Category. Awarded by the Asian/Pacific American Librarians Association
 2015-2016 University Research Professor, Wilfrid Laurier University
 2010 Honorable Mention: The Association for Asian American Studies Literature Book Award for 2008
 2008 Aid to Scholarly Publications Grant
 1994 Unsex’d Revolutionaries Short-listed for the 1994 Raymond Klibansky Book Prize in English
 1993 Aid to Scholarly Publications Grant

Selected publications

Books authored :
 Asianfail: Narratives of Disenchantment and the Model Minority. Champaign: University of Illinois Press, 2017
 Unfastened:  Globality and Asian North American Narratives.  Minneapolis: University of Minnesota Press, 2010
 The Politics of the Visible in Asian North American Narratives.Toronto: University of Toronto Press, 2004
 Empowering the Feminine: The Narratives of Mary Robinson, Jane West, and Amelia Opie, 1796-1812. Toronto: University of Toronto Press, 1998
  Unsex’d Revolutionaries: Five Women Novelists of the 1790s. Theory and Culture Series. Toronto: University of Toronto Press, 1993

Books/Journals edited:
 Migration, Exile and Diaspora in Graphic Life Narratives. a/b: Auto/Biography Studies (Co-edited with Candida Rifkind and Nima Naghibi). Spring 2020.
 Canadian Literature and Cultural Memory (Co-edited with Cynthia Sugars.)   Toronto: Oxford University Press, 2014
 The Memory Effect: The Remediation of Memory in Literature and Film (Co-edited with Russell J.A. Kilbourn).  Waterloo, ON: Wilfrid Laurier University Press, 2013
 Asian Canadian Writing Beyond Autoethnography (Co-edited with Christl Verduyn).  Waterloo, ON: Wilfrid Laurier University Press, 2008
 Asian North American Identities Beyond the Hyphen (Co-edited with Donald Goellnicht). Bloomington: Indiana University Press, 2004
 Memoirs of Emma Courtney by Mary Hays (1796)(Ed.). Oxford: Oxford World's Classics, 1996. xlv + 220 pp. 2nd ed., 2000
 The Victim of Prejudice by Mary Hays (1799)(Ed.). Peterborough and Lewiston, N.Y.: Broadview Press, 1994. xxxviii + 198pp. 2nd ed., 1998

Chapters in books : (Selected)
 Social Issues in Three 21st Century Texts About Growing up Canadian, in "Zeitschrift für Kanada-Studien" ZKS, 68, Wißner, Augsburg 2018  pp 103 – 113
 "(East and Southeast) Asian Canadian Literature: The Strange and the Familiar." The Oxford Handbook of Canadian Literature.  Ed. Cynthia Sugars. 564–582. New York:  Oxford University Press, 2016
 "Contemporary Filipino American Writers and the Legacy of Imperialism." Chapter 21 of Cambridge History of Asian American Literature. Eds. Rajini Srikanth and Min Song.  371–386.  New York: Cambridge University Press, 2015
 "Revising the Romance of the Land:  Place in Settler Narratives by Contemporary Asian Canadian Writers."  The Canadian Mosaic in the Age of Transnationalism.  Ed.  Brigitte Glaser and Jutta Ernst.  Heidelberg:  Universitatsverlag Winter Heidelberg, 2010.  163-178
 "A Filipino Prufrock in an Alien Land: Bienvenido Santos’ The Man Who (Thought He) Looked Like Robert Taylor." Lit: Literature, Interpretation, Theory. Special Issue on Asian American Literature and Culture. Ed. Karen Chow. 12.3 (Summer 2001): 267-283

References

1958 births
Living people
Canadian educators
Canadian film educators
Canadian women academics
Academics in Ontario
Academic staff of Wilfrid Laurier University